Michèle Cortes (born 10 May 1933), known professionally as Françoise Fabian, is a French film actress. She has appeared in more than 100 films since 1956. In 1971, Fabian signed the Manifesto of the 343, publicly declaring having had an abortion.

Filmography

References

External links
 
 

1933 births
Living people
French film actresses
People from Algiers
Pieds-Noirs
20th-century French actresses
21st-century French actresses
Signatories of the 1971 Manifesto of the 343